Bučina is a municipality and village in Ústí nad Orlicí District in the Pardubice Region of the Czech Republic. It has about 300 inhabitants.

References

External links

Villages in Ústí nad Orlicí District